David Tootill (born 22 May 1986) is an English former professional rugby league footballer. Tootill played for Harlequins RL in the  Super League. He was previously with the Leeds Rhinos and has also played for Batley Bulldogs, York City Knights as well as his home town Oldham RLFC (Heritage № 1168).

Background
David Tootill was born in Oldham, Greater Manchester, England.

References

External links
 Quins RL profile
(archived by web.archive.org) Always seems to be a lot of movement for the London club
(archived by web.archive.org) Quins land young British trio
(archived by web.archive.org) David Tootill player profile
 Recruitment in focus (Friday, 15 December 2006)
(archived by web.archive.org) Rhinos aim to keep out neighbours

1986 births
Living people
English rugby league players
Leeds Rhinos players
London Broncos players
Oldham R.L.F.C. players
Rugby league players from Oldham
Rugby league props
Rugby league second-rows